John George Milburn (December 14, 1851 – August 11, 1930) was a prominent lawyer in Buffalo, New York and New York City, a president of the New York City Bar Association, and a partner at the law firm Carter Ledyard & Milburn.

Early life
Milburn was born on December 14, 1851 near Sunderland, England in 1851, the son of a civil engineer. In his youth, he studied civil engineering at the insistence of his father. However, at the age of eighteen his sister wrote to him from Batavia, New York urging him to emigrate to America, which he did the following year.

Career
In 1867, he arrived in Batavia to study law with the firm of Wakeman & Watson. Though he was initially denied entrance to the bar because he was not an American citizen, several influential acquaintances successfully petitioned the New York State Legislature for an exception based on his intention to seek citizenship. He was granted admission to the bar in 1874.

In 1876, the newly married Milburns moved to Buffalo, New York, which was developing as a major industrial city.  He practiced law alone until 1879, when he formed the law firm of Sprague, Milburn & Sprague with Hon. E.C. Sprague and Henry W. Sprague.  In 1882, after working for a year in Denver, Colorado, Milburn returned to Buffalo to form the law firm Rogers, Locke & Milburn, with Sherman Rogers and Francis Locke.

Citizen of Buffalo
Milburn was a prominent citizen of Buffalo, serving as president of the Buffalo Club, a member of the executive board of the Buffalo Public Library, and a trustee of the Erie County and City Hall in Buffalo. He was also a prominent Democrat and a personal friend of Grover Cleveland.

Milburn is perhaps best known as the President of the Pan-American Exposition, the 1901 World's Fair in Buffalo. He prepared a suite in his house to host President William McKinley, who was coming to the Exposition. After the president was fatally shot by anarchist Leon Czolgosz at the Exposition on September 6, 1901, he was treated at the hospital and brought back to Milburn's home. He died there eight days later.

Because of this event, the house became a popular tourist site. After it passed out of the family, it was later adapted as a hotel; it was demolished in 1957.

Later career
In 1904, at the invitation of the prominent attorney Lewis Cass Ledyard, Milburn joined the New York City law firm of Carter, Rollins & Ledyard, which became Carter, Ledyard & Milburn upon his joining. There, Milburn represented many high-profile clients, including Standard Oil, the New York Stock Exchange, and the Metropolitan Street Railway. He also served as president of the New York City Bar Association from 1920 to 1921.

Personal life
In 1875, he married Mary Patty Stocking (d. 1930), a teacher at Bryan's Seminary and the daughter of farmers in Wyoming County. Together, they were the parents of three sons:

 Devereux Milburn (1881–1942), who married Nancy Gordon Steele (d. 1955) in 1913.
 John George Milburn, Jr. (1882–1932), also a lawyer.
 Ralph Milburn (b. 1888), who married Anne Scarborough Hollingsworth, daughter of William Hollingsworth in 1910.

Milburn died on August 11, 1930, at Claridge's Hotel while on a trip to London, England.  He was 78 years old. His estate was worth $1,735,059 upon his death.

Descendants
Through his son John Jr. he was the grandfather of Dorothy Milburn (1907–1985), who married Samuel Sloan Auchincloss, Jr. (1903–1991) (whom she divorced in 1938 and married Frank Ford Russell that same year and Saint-John Perse in 1958), and Patty Milburn (1910–1986), who married Edgar Stirling Auchincloss III (1909–2000), who founded the Country Club of Darien.

References
Notes

Sources
 Mark Goldman. High Hopes: The Rise and Decline of Buffalo, New York. Albany, NY: State University of New York Press, 1983.

External links
 

1851 births
1930 deaths
Lawyers from Buffalo, New York
People from Sunderland
New York (state) lawyers
Presidents of the New York City Bar Association
New York (state) Democrats
19th-century American lawyers
20th-century American lawyers
English emigrants to the United States